Aristippus of Argos was a tyrant of Argos in the 3rd century BC. His grandfather may have been the Aristippus installed as tyrant by the Macedonian king Antigonus II Gonatas in 272, and his father was the tyrant Aristomachos the Elder. When Aristomachus was assassinated by slaves in 240, Aristippus took control of the city.

After resisting several assaults by the Achaean League under Aratus of Sicyon, Aristippus was killed during an unsuccessful counterattack on the city of Cleonae in 235. He was succeeded by his younger brother Aristomachos of Argos who later led his city to join the Achaean League.

An Argive, a different person from the preceding, who also became tyrant of Argos after the murder of Aristomachus I., in the time of Aratus. He is described by Plutarch as a perfect tyrant in our sense of the word. Aratus made many attempts to deprive him of the tyranny, but at first without success; but Aristippus at length fell in a battle against Aratus, and was succeeded in the tyranny by Aristomachus II.

References

 

Ancient Greek tyrants
235 BC deaths
Ancient Argives
3rd-century BC Greek people
Year of birth unknown